The 2014 MTV Video Music Awards Japan was held on June 14, 2014 at the Maihama Amphitheater in Chiba. Hosted by Sayumi Michishige, T.M.Revolution, and W-inds, the ceremony honored the best Japanese 
and Western music and music videos released in Japan between March 1, 2013 and February 28, 2014. Beyoncé and Kyary Pamyu Pamyu were the most-nominated artists, with three nominations apiece. Kyary Pamyu Pamyu won two awards, for Album of the Year and Best Karaokee! Song respectively, and was the most-awarded artist of the night.

Broadcast
The show was broadcast live domestically on MTV Japan at 18:00JST; on MTV Asia in Singapore, Malaysia, Indonesia, Korea, China, Taiwan, Vietnam, Philippines, Thailand; and on J-One in France. The main part of the ceremony was streamed online via the official VMAJ website by digital partner GyaO! to domestic and international viewers. MTV Japan aired the television replay the following day at 15:00JST.

Viewership of the live broadcast on MTV Japan reached 20 million households.

Performances
Glay and Hatsune Miku were the second acts to be announced as performers, on April 21. This was the first time either act would be performing on the VMAJ stage. Kaela Kimura was announced next, on May 13—the appearance marked her first live performance in over a year since March 2013. Coldplay was added to the lineup on May 19, with the news that they would be performing a new song.

Presenters

Chiaki Horan
Funassyi
Hyadain
Rev. from DVL
Ryu-boshiryo
Kavka Shishido
Takeshi Takei

Winners and nominees

Nominees were selected from among Western and Japanese music and music videos released in Japan between March 1, 2013 and February 28, 2014. Nominations were released on March 28, 2014. Voting began that same day, via the MTV VMAJ website, and took place until May 28. Beyoncé and Kyary Pamyu Pamyu tied for the most nominations of any artist that year with three each. The latter became the most awarded artist of the night after winning two of her three nominations. Exile won their fifth Video of the Year award—they first won it in 2008—setting a new record in MTV VMAJ history.

Winners are highlighted in bold.

See also 
 2014 MTV Video Music Awards
 2014 MTV Europe Music Awards

References

External links

MTV Video Music Awards Japan website

2014 in Japanese music
2014 music awards